Jane Nikoloski (born 12 December 1973) is a Macedonian former footballer who played as a goalkeeper.

Playing career

Club
Nikoloski returned from Bulgaria for FK Sloga Jugomagnat in July 2003. In 2005, he left for Iranian club Persepolis F.C. In January 2006, he was signed by Croatian club NK Slaven Belupo. In June 2007, he joined APOEL where he helped his team to win the 2007–08 Cypriot Cup. In January 2009, he moved to AEP Paphos.

International
He made his senior debut for Macedonia in a July 2000 friendly match against Azerbaijan and has earned a total of 27 caps, scoring no goals. He was the first-choice goalkeeper for the Macedonia national team in UEFA Euro 2008 qualifying, playing the first 7 games. He was then replaced by Petar Miloševski. His final international was a September 2009 FIFA World Cup qualification match against Scotland.

Managerial career 
After was in 2014 managed Pobeda Junior, Nikoloski in September 2015 became a coach of Turnovo.

References

External links
 Player profile 
 
 Profile at Macedonian Football 
 Jane Nikolovski at Footballdatabase

1973 births
Living people
Sportspeople from Prilep
Association football goalkeepers
Macedonian footballers
North Macedonia international footballers
FK Pobeda players
FK Pelister players
Apollon Pontou FC players
FK Sloga Jugomagnat players
PFC Slavia Sofia players
FK Napredok players
Persepolis F.C. players
NK Slaven Belupo players
APOEL FC players
AEP Paphos FC players
Aris Limassol FC players
Macedonian First Football League players
First Professional Football League (Bulgaria) players
Croatian Football League players
Cypriot First Division players
Macedonian expatriate footballers
Expatriate footballers in Greece
Macedonian expatriate sportspeople in Greece
Expatriate footballers in Bulgaria
Macedonian expatriate sportspeople in Bulgaria
Expatriate footballers in Iran
Macedonian expatriate sportspeople in Iran
Expatriate footballers in Croatia
Macedonian expatriate sportspeople in Croatia
Expatriate footballers in Cyprus
Macedonian expatriate sportspeople in Cyprus
Macedonian football managers
Aris Limassol FC managers
FK Horizont Turnovo managers
FK Pobeda managers
Macedonian expatriate football managers
Expatriate football managers in Cyprus